Stander may refer to:

Standing frame for assisting the physically challenged
Stander (surname)
Stander (film) 2003 film about bank robber Andre Stander
Line stander job position